The 1998 Suwon Samsung Bluewings season was Suwon Samsung Bluewings's third season in the K-League in Republic of Korea. Suwon Samsung Bluewings is competing in K-League, League Cup, Korean FA Cup and Asian Cup Winners' Cup.

Squad

Backroom Staff

Coaching Staff
Head coach:  Kim Ho
Assistant coach:  Choi Kang-Hee
Reserve Team Coach:  Park Hang-Seo
Playing Coach:  Yoon Sung-Hyo

Scouter
 Jung Kyu-Poong

Honours

Club
K-League Winners

Individual
K-League MVP:  Ko Jong-Su
K-League Manager of the Year:  Kim Ho
K-League Best XI:  Ko Jong-Su,  Saša

References

External links
 Suwon Bluewings Official website

1998
Suwon Samsung Bluewings